Carrie Wong Si Tian (born 1 January 1994) is a Singaporean actress. She was discovered through the reality television competition Hey Gorgeous.

Early life
The only child of a housewife mother and father who works in a security firm, Wong was raised in a Chinese-speaking family. Her father is Singaporean while her mother is a Malaysian Chinese. She studied at Evergreen Secondary School and graduated with a diploma in Hospitality and Tourism Management from Nanyang Polytechnic in 2014. Wong was a blogshop model during her polytechnic years. She was scouted in her final year for Hey Gorgeous in 2013, where she made it as the second runner up.

Career
Wong was chosen as one of the six contestants for the Preliminary Rounds of Hey Gorgeous in 2013, emerging as a first runner-up.

Wong made her acting debut in Scrum, where she plays a disabled Sport Sciences polytechnic student. It aired in February 2014 on Channel U.

In September 2014, Wong starred in her first MediaCorp Channel 8 drama Against the Tide alongside Christopher Lee, Rui En and Desmond Tan, playing a schizophrenic woman. The drama aired from 24 to 24 September October 2014 for 23 episodes.

In November 2014, Wong starred in end-of-year blockbuster The Journey: Tumultuous Times, where she plays a hot-tempered sweet soup seller. Her acting garnered positive reviews, which garnered her a nomination for Best Newcomer, Best Supporting Actress and bagged her first Top 10 Most Popular Artistes on Star Awards 2015.

Shortly after The Journey: Tumultuous Times, she was involved in long-running drama 118 where she plays a girl from Malaysia coming to Singapore to look for her father. The drama aired from 20 October 2014, to 16 October 2015, for 255 episodes on Channel 8.

In 2015, Wong landed her first leading role in romance drama Sealed With A Kiss, acting alongside Rebecca Lim, Elvin Ng and Zhang Zhenhuan. The drama aired from  27 August to 24 September 2015, for 20 episodes on Channel 8.

On the same year, She also starred in her second long-running drama Life – Fear Not, which aired from 19 October 2015, to 1 April 2016, for 120 episodes on Channel 8.

In 2016, Wong bagged her second Top 10 Most Popular Artistes Award and was nominated for Best Supporting Actress Award on Star Awards 2016.

On the same year, Wong made her small screen comeback in The Gentlemen as one of the leading females, playing a woman who knows what cup size women should wear just by one look. The drama aired from 9 August to 5 September 2016, for 20 episodes on Channel 8. She also starred in nursing drama You Can Be An Angel 2, playing a former lawyer who later became a nurse. The drama was well-received and aired from 1 to 28 November 2016, for 20 episodes on Channel 8.

In 2017, Wong starred in Dream Coder, playing front-end developer who later suffered from brain tumours. It aired from 7 February to 6 March 2017, for 20 episodes on Channel 8. On the same year, she starred in My Friends From Afar, playing an alien from the AMIKUS Planet who fell in love with a human being who later is revealed to be half-human and half-alien. Her role garnered her first nomination for Best Actress in Star Awards 2018.

In 2018, Wong bagged her fourth Top 10 Most Popular Artistes Award on Star Awards 2018. She also acted in meWATCH original series My Agent Is A Hero, VIC, and Love At Cavenagh Bridge before going on a half year break for acting lesson in Taiwan. She returned to the small screen on the same year in October in You Can Be An Angel 3.

In 2019, she bagged her fifth Top 10 Most Popular Artistes Award and gained a second nomination for Best Actress in Star Awards 2019 for her role in meWATCH original series VIC. She also had lead roles in Hello Miss Driver, and My One In A Million.

In 2020, Wong starred in period time travel drama A Quest to Heal. Filming began in late 2019 and made its debut on 20 July 2020, on Channel 8. On the same year, she made her return to long-running drama in Recipe of Life.

Filmography

Television

Variety shows

Discography

Compilation album

Drama OST

Awards and nominations

References

1994 births
Living people
Singaporean television personalities
Singaporean people of Hakka descent
Nanyang Polytechnic alumni
Singaporean television actresses